Yangping Township is a township of Kelan County in northwestern Shanxi province, China. , it has 13 villages under its administration.

See also 
 List of township-level divisions of Shanxi

References 

Township-level divisions of Shanxi
Xinzhou